Shokan Shyngysuly Valikhanov, given name Mukhammed Kanafiya (November 1835 – April 10, 1865) was a Kazakh scholar, ethnographer, historian and participant in the Great Game. He is regarded as the father of modern Kazakh historiography and ethnography.
The  Kazakh Academy of Sciences became the Ch.Ch. Valikhanov Kazakh Academy of Sciences in 1960.
English-language texts sometimes give his name as "Chokan Valikhanov", based on a transliteration of the Russian spelling
that he used himself.

Childhood
Muhammed Shoqan Shyngysuly Qanafiya Walikhanov was born in November 1835 in the newly developed Aman-Karagai district within the Kushmurun fort in what is nowadays the Kostanay Province, Kazakhstan.  He was a fourth generation descendant of Abu'l-Mansur Khan, a khan of the Kazakh Middle Jüz, he was a direct descendant of Genghis khan.  Shoqan's family was very respected by the government of the Russian Empire, and Walikhanov's father was awarded, during his life, six appointments as senior Sultan of Kushmurun okrug, a term as chief Kazakh advisor to the frontier board, a promotion to Colonel, and a separate term as senior Sultan in the Kokshetau okrug.

Shoqan spent his youth in his father’s traditional yurt. His father Chingis arranged his son’s early education, enrolling him in 1842 at age six in a small private school, or maktab, which provided a secular education. Here he began his education in the Kazakh language, which used the Arabic script at the time.

At an early age Shoqan moved from his father’s home to the estate of his paternal grandmother Aiganym, in Syrymbet. Shoqan was enrolled in the Siberian Cadet Corps by his grandmother.

Walikhanov entered the military academy in Omsk in 1847.  After graduating from the Omsk Cadet School, where he read not only Russian but also English literature, Walikhanov traveled extensively in Central Asia in the late 1850s.  It was during his stay in Omsk that Walikhanov first made the acquaintance of Fyodor Dostoevsky.

Adult life
His work combined military intelligence and geographic exploration and other things.  His first successful expedition was his 1855-56 mission to the region of Issyq Köl.  He was afterwards called to the capital in St. Petersburg in 1857 to report, and there he was elected to the Russian Geographical Society.

The expedition ended following increased suspicions, and they left Kashgar in April 1859. Walikhanov returned to St. Petersburg and became a fixture of the intellectual and cultural life during his short stay (1860 - spring of 1861) in the capital.  The young Walikhanov was a staunch proponent of Westernization and critical of the influence of Islam in his homeland.  In the words of the ethnographer Nikolai Yadrintsev, for Walikhanov European civilization represented "the new Quran of life."

In the spring of 1861 he became seriously ill with tuberculosis and had to leave St. Petersburg. He returned to his native steppe region in hopes of restoring his health. He never returned to St. Petersburg while frequent relapses in his health prevented advances in his career. In letters to his friend Dostoevsky, Walikhanov mentioned several unsuccessful plans to return to St. Petersburg.  Walikhanov also mentioned campaigning for a political position in the West-Siberian Governor Generalship, centered in Tobolsk, like his father. In 1862, he successfully ran for senior Sultan, but Governor-General Alexander Duhamel :ru:Дюгамель, Александр Осипович refused to confirm his position due to Walikhanov's health.

Walikhanov collected materials on Kazakh judicial practices in 1863. This was part of a government-backed project given by Duhamel, and led to the 1864 Memorandum on Judicial Reform. In 1864, Shoqan was assigned to help with Colonel Cherniaev's continued conquest of Central Asia.  Cherniaev’s forces marched west from the fortress of Vernoe (modern-day Almaty). Chernaiev advanced towards the Khanate of Kokand, planning to attack the fort at Aulie-Ata (modern-day Taraz). Shoqan unsuccessfully pushed for a negotiated result without violence.  Cherniaev won an easy victory and returned to Vernoe. Shoqan left Chernaiev after the events at Aulie-Ata and, after stopping Vernoe, moved to the village of Sultan Tezek on the Ili River north of Vernoe. Colonel Cherniaev, however, was not unhappy with Walikhanov's work, and recommended him for a promotion.

Shoqan spent his last remaining months in the village of Sultan Tezek, eventually marrying Sultan Tezek’s sister, Aisary. During this time, letters of correspondence to General Kolpakovski, military governor of Semipalatinsk oblast, dated between November 1864 through February 1865, addressed Muslim revolts and rebel activity in nearby Qulja. Kolpakovski held such esteem for Shoqan that he offered Shoqan a position in his administration once his health was restored.

Walikhanov succumbed to his illness on April 10, 1865 at the age of 29. 
He was buried in the nearby cemetery of Kochen-Togan in present-day Almaty Province.

Nikolay Veselovsky, who in 1904 edited a collection of Walikhanov’s works, said that the short life of Walikhanov was a “meteor flashing across the field of oriental studies."

Walikhanov and Dostoevsky

While still in Omsk, Dostoevsky had met Shoqan Walikhanov.  In Dostoevsky's opinion, Walikhanov was a brilliant, intrepid person, a scholar and ethnographer, and a talented folklorist.  In their correspondence, the two intellectuals admitted their great mutual love and admiration.

When Dostoevsky served in Semipalatinsk (now known as Semey), he met Walikhanov once again. The two men were also closely acquainted with renowned geographer Peter Semenov Tian-Shansky and Baron A. E. Wrangel, who came to Semipalatinsk from Petersburg in 1854 to serve as the new district prosecutor.

Dostoevsky wrote from Semipalatinsk on 14 December 1856 one of his most enthusiastic letters ever, addressed to his friend Walikhanov:

There is a statue of Walikhanov and Dostoevsky in the city of Semey, Kazakhstan, near the local Dostoevsky museum.

Major works
Walikhanov produced many articles and books devoted to the history and culture of Central Asia.  A short list:
 "Chinese Turkestan and Dzungaria: Walikhanov and other Russian travellers", The Russians in Central Asia, London, Edward Stanford, 1865.
 Traces of Shamanism among the Kazakhs
 Regarding the camps of Kazakh nomads
 The Qazakhs
 Tengri 
 Forms of Kazakh Traditional Poesy 
 Issyk-Kul Travel Journal
 Kul-Ju Travel Journal
 Notes on jungars 

Walikhanov also compiled epic poetry, including "Kozy-Korpesh - Bayan-Sulu", as well as collecting the first known recorded variant of what he called the Iliad of the Steppe, the Epic of Manas, from an unnamed performer later identified as Nazar Bolot uulu.

Walikhanov's report of his trip to Kashgar in 1858-59 remains a valuable account on the situation in Xinjiang in the aftermath of Wali Khan's invasion of the region and on the eve of the Muslim Rebellion of the 1860s.

The Shoqan Walikhanov spring
The Shoqan Walikhanov spring is in the Altyn-Emel National Park. It is located in the Kerbulak district of Almaty region, on the road to the singing Dunes, among the tract at the foot of the Maly Kalkan Mountains. Shoqan Walikhanov names the spring. Walikhanov's path ran from Russia to Kashgaria in 1856, through the territory of what is now the park. The expedition stopped to rest at the spring. Since that time, there has been a folk belief that the water in the spring is healing and can cure many diseases. There is a small stream from which possible to drink water in July and August months, when the spring mostly dries up.

Notes

References

Works by Walikhanov available in English
 "General view of Dzungaria" and "Travels in Dzungaria", by Captain Walikhanov: in

External links
 Information on Shoqan from the Smithsonian
 Artwork of Shoqan Walikhanov
 www.neweurasia.net (biography) (in English)
 www.peoples.ru Shoqan Walikhanov (in Russian)
 Shoqan Walikhanov in Omsk (in Russian)
  (in Alexander M. Kobrinsky's library): Shoqan Walikhanov (photos, biography)
  Biography from the UNESCO branch in Kazakhstan

Kazakhstani historians
Turkologists
Ethnographers
1835 births
1865 deaths
People from Kostanay Region
Kazakhstani orientalists
19th-century deaths from tuberculosis
Tuberculosis deaths in Kazakhstan